Israt Sultana Elen Bhutto is a Bangladesh Nationalist Party politician and the former Member of Parliament from Jhalokati-2.

Career
Bhutto was elected to Parliament in a by-election in 2000 from Jhalokati-2 as a Bangladesh Nationalist Party candidate. The seat fell vacant following the death of her husband and Member of Parliament, Zulfiker Ali Bhutto. She was re-elected in the 2001 Bangladesh General election as a candidate of Bangladesh Nationalist Party beating Bangladesh Awami League politician, Amir Hossain Amu. In 2006, she was sued by Chunnu Mollah, older brother of her Zulfiker, accusing her of murdering her husband.

References

Living people
Year of birth missing (living people)
People from Jhalokati district
Bangladesh Nationalist Party politicians
Women members of the Jatiya Sangsad
7th Jatiya Sangsad members
8th Jatiya Sangsad members
21st-century Bangladeshi women politicians